The following is a list of famous French military leaders from the Gauls to modern France. The list is necessarily subjective and incomplete. 

 
Leaders